English rock band Def Leppard have recorded songs for eleven studio albums and one EP. After their formation in November 1977, Def Leppard began rehearsing and writing songs together. The band, which consisted of vocalist Joe Elliott, guitarists Steve Clark and Pete Willis, bassist Rick Savage, and drummer Tony Kenning had prepared 3 songs to be recorded on The Def Leppard E.P. in November 1978. Following the abrupt departure of Kenning, Def Leppard hired Frank Noon from The Next Band to step in on drum duties for the recording of the EP, which was released in January 1979. The EP spawned the single "Getcha Rocks Off" which began to receive airplay in the UK.

The band was soon signed to a record deal with Phonogram/Vertigo (Mercury Records in the US) and began recorded a new single "Wasted" in September 1979 with new full-time drummer Rick Allen. The single was released in November with "Hello America" as a b-side, charting at no. 61 in the UK. In December, Def Leppard recorded their first full-length studio album On Through the Night which would be released on 14 March 1980. The album, which included re-recorded versions of "Wasted", "Hello America", as well as two tracks from the EP charted at no. 15 in the UK and spawned the release of "Hello America" as a single in addition to "Rock Brigade". The band soon caught the attention of renowned producer Robert John "Mutt" Lange who agreed to produce their sophomore effort. Recorded in early 1981, Def Leppard released High 'n' Dry in July, with two singles "Let it Go" and "Bringin' On the Heartbreak".

The band spend the next year touring in support of High 'n' Dry and began recording tracks for a third album. Willis, after being fired in July 1982, was replaced by guitarist Phil Collen, and both of them feature on Pyromania, released in January 1983. Supported by the hit singles "Photograph" and "Rock of Ages", spent several weeks at no. 2 on the Billboard 200 chart. The album, which eventually sold over ten million copies in the US also spawned the singles "Too Late for Love" and "Foolin'" in late 1983. This lineup would go onto release seven singles for their follow up album Hysteria including their only no. 1 song, "Love Bites".

With the death of Steve Clark in 1991, Def Leppard finished their sixth album Adrenalize as a four piece. Vivian Campbell joined the band in April 1992 to set the current lineup, which has gone to release a further six studio albums.

Songs

See also
Def Leppard discography

References

External links
Official Website

Def Leppard
Def Leppard